Taras Klymovych Vintsiuk  (sometimes also spelled as 'Vintsyuk'; ; 10 March 1939, Kulchyn – † 29 May 2012, Kyiv) – pioneer in pattern recognition theory, author of fundamental works in the field of speech recognition, initiator and organizer of the State R&D Program "Pattern Computer". Originator of "Pattern recognition generative model" research school. Laureate of many awards. Founder and President (till 2012) of the Ukrainian Association for Information Processing and Pattern Recognition (UAsIPPR).

Biography 

Taras Vintsiuk was born on 10 March 1939 in the village of Kulchyn, Volyn' oblast in the family repressed by Soviet regime. In the postwar years he lived in an orphanage and later joined to relates. In 1956 he graduated a school with a golden medal. In 1956–1961 he studied at the Kiev Polytechnic Institute, having graduated it with honors. His scientific labor way Taras began in 1962 as an engineer. In 1988, he headed the Speech Science Department at Hlushkov Institute of Cybernetics and International Research and Training Center for Information Technologies and Systems (since 1997).

R&D activity 

Widely applied generative model for pattern recognition was firstly formulated and proposed by Taras Vintsiuk in 1967. This approach, commonly known as Dynamic Time Warping (DTW), is used not only in the theory of speech and visual pattern recognition, but also in text processing and non-linear process modeling in radio-physics and biology. Similar model, known as Hidden Markov Model (HMM), was originated in 1973 and is the most cited in the world. Both models are most productive in speech recognition systems and possess global leading positions.

Since late 1960s, the teams led by Taras Vintsiuk developed speech recognition systems having passed a long way from spoken dialogue systems based on the BESM to portable devices controlled by voice.

Scientific research of Taras Vintsiuk is reflected in more than 300 papers and two books, marked by higher rewards and diplomas of many exhibitions. In the group of authors he was awarded the State Prize of Ukraine in 1988 and 1997 in the field of science and technology. Taras Vintsiuk is creator of the Pattern Computer concept that formed the basis of the National Scientific and Technical Program (2000–2010).

Public activity 

Taras Vintsiuk was a member of many scientific societies, program committees and editorial boards of many conferences and research journals. He founded and always headed the Ukrainian Association for Information Processing and Pattern Recognition (UAsIPPR). Since 1992, he organized 10 international conferences on signal processing and pattern recognition "UkrObraz" and published the conference Proceedings. Since 2004, Taras every year organized summer schools dedicated to speech science and technology.

Taras Vintsiuk contributed numerous entries to the Encyclopedia of Modern Ukraine in the domain of cybernetics and computing.

References

External links
 Ukrainian Association for Information Processing and Pattern Recognition (UAsIPPR)
 Комп'ютер: Бачу, чую, мислю… нова робота українських учених — прорив у галузі кібернетики й інформатики
 Б. Н. Малиновский — История вычислительной техники в лицах
 Енциклопедія сучасної України на e-catalog.name

Sources 
 Vintsyuk, T.K. "Speech discrimination by dynamic programming". Kibernetika, Vol. 4, pp. 81–88, Jan.-Feb. 1968
 Т. К. Винцюк. Анализ, распознавание и смысловая интерпретация речевых сигналов. – Киев. Наукова думка, 1987–261 стор.
 В. М. Глушков, Т. К. Винцюк, В. Г. Величко. "Говорящие" ЭВМ: речевой ввод и вывод информации. – Знание, 1975 – 61 стор.
 Вінцюк Т. К. Образний комп'ютер // Сучасні проблеми в комп'ютерних науках. Зб. наук. праць, Вид-во Нац. ун-ту "Львівська політехніка", Львів, 2000, с. 5–14

1939 births
2012 deaths
Ukrainian computer scientists
Laureates of the State Prize of Ukraine in Science and Technology
People from Volyn Oblast